Kings Kangwa (born 6 April 1999) is a Zambian professional footballer who plays for Red Star Belgrade and the Zambia national team as a central midfielder.

Club career
Kangwa began his career at Lusaka-based club Happy Hearts. In 2017, Kangwa signed for Israeli club Hapoel Be'er Sheva, before returning to Happy Hearts in 2018. Ahead of the 2019 Zambian Super League season, Kangwa signed for Buildcon. On 10 July 2019, Kangwa joined Russian club Arsenal Tula. On 29 May 2022, Kangwa joined Serbian club Red Star Belgrade.

International career
In November 2018, Kangwa was called up by Zambia U20 ahead of the 2018 COSAFA U-20 Cup.

On 9 June 2019, Kangwa made his debut for Zambia in a 2–1 loss against Cameroon. On 16 July 2019, Kangwa scored his first goal for Zambia in a 3–2 win against Morocco.

Personal life
Kangwa's older brother, Evans, also represents the Zambian national team.

Career statistics

Club

International

International goals
Scores and results list Zambia's goal tally first.

References

1999 births
Living people
People from Kasama District
Zambian footballers
Association football midfielders
Zambia international footballers
Zambia youth international footballers
Hapoel Be'er Sheva F.C. players
Buildcon F.C. players
FC Arsenal Tula players
Red Star Belgrade footballers
Russian Premier League players
Serbian SuperLiga players
Zambian expatriate footballers
Zambian expatriate sportspeople in Israel
Expatriate footballers in Israel
Zambian expatriate sportspeople in Russia
Expatriate footballers in Serbia
Expatriate footballers in Russia
2019 Africa U-23 Cup of Nations players